Canadian rock band Theory of a Deadman has recorded material for seven studio albums and one extended play (EP), consisting of 90 original songs, 10 acoustic versions of original work, and 11 covers. The band was formed in 1999 in Delta, British Columbia, and signed a recording contract with Chad Kroeger's 604 Records in 2001. The group worked with Kroeger on their self-titled debut album which was released in September 2002. The band's name originated from the title of one of the album's recordings, which was later renamed "The Last Song".

Their second album, Gasoline (2005), spawned several tracks that were featured in 2005's video game Fahrenheit (also known as Indigo Prophecy). The band headed back to the recording studio in 2007 to work on Scars & Souvenirs (2008), which stayed on the Billboard 200 chart for 110 consecutive weeks while subsequent albums The Truth Is... (2011) and Savages (2014) peaked within the top 10 on the same chart. Three singles—"Bad Girlfriend", "Lowlife", and "Rx (Medicate)"—have reached the number one position on Billboard'''s Mainstream Rock chart. Of the band's 111 songs, 37 have been released as singles and some have appeared on soundtracks for films such as Transformers: Revenge of the Fallen (2009) and Transformers: Dark of the Moon (2011). The group has made nearly a dozen cover songs, including versions originally recorded by artists such as Sting and Lynyrd Skynyrd, as well as songs used for events for the WWE.

For their first five studio albums, Theory of a Deadman's music was a combination of post-grunge, hard rock, alternative rock, and alternative metal, blended with elements of country music. With the release of their sixth studio album, Wake Up Call (2017), the band reinvented themselves with a shift toward a genre that was aligned more with pop music, along with an abbreviated band name, Theory. The group is well known for lyrics that cover a range of topics. Songs like "Angel" and "Santa Monica" are ballads that talk about love and heartbreak, while "Blow", "Rx (Medicate)", and "History of Violence" concern issues that plague society. Because of its message of overcoming adversity, "Sacrifice" was chosen as the theme song for the United States Olympics team during the 2008 Summer Olympics in Beijing, China. Lead vocalist and guitarist, Tyler Connolly, is the band's primary lyricist, but all members have shared a collective part in the songwriting process. Four of the group's seven studio albums—along with an acoustic EP released in 2015—were produced by Howard Benson and his team in Los Angeles, California, while Wake Up Call and Say Nothing'' (2020) were recorded in London in a collaboration with Swedish producer Martin Terefe.

Songs

Notes

References

External links
Theory of a Deadman songs at Allmusic
Theory of a Deadman at Discogs

Theory of a Deadman songs
Theory of a Deadman